Copper(II) borate is an inorganic compound with the formula Cu3(BO3)2. It has previously studied due to its photocatalytic properties.

Preparation 
Copper(II) borate can be prepared by heating a stoichiometric mixture of copper(II) oxide and diboron trioxideto 900 °C.

3CuO + B2O3 -> Cu3(BO3)2

See also 

 Orthoborate (BO33-)

References 

Borates
Catalysts
Inorganic compounds
Copper(II) compounds